Tamaza  is a Syrian village located in Tell Salhab Subdistrict in Al-Suqaylabiyah District, Hama.  According to the Syria Central Bureau of Statistics (CBS), Tamaza had a population of 101 in the 2004 census.

References 

Populated places in al-Suqaylabiyah District